Roger Leach may refer to:

 Roger Leach (actor) (1948–2001), English-Australian actor
 Roger Leach (cricketer) (1853–1889), English cricketer